Almina Hodžić (born 2 November 1988) is a Bosnian footballer who plays as a goalkeeper and has appeared for the Bosnia and Herzegovina women's national team.

Career
Hodžić has been capped for the Bosnia and Herzegovina national team, appearing for the team during the 2019 FIFA Women's World Cup qualifying cycle.

References

External links
 
 
 

1988 births
Living people
Bosnia and Herzegovina women's footballers
Bosnia and Herzegovina women's international footballers
Women's association football goalkeepers